Gliocephalotrichum simplex is a species of fungus belonging to the family Nectriaceae.

Synonym:
 Cylindrocladium simplex J.A.Mey. (= basionym)

References

Nectriaceae